The Left-Handed Hummingbird is an original novel written by Kate Orman and based on the long-running British science fiction television series Doctor Who. It features the Seventh Doctor, Ace and Bernice. A prelude to the novel, also written by Orman, appeared in Doctor Who Magazine #207. This novel is the third novel in the "Alternate Universe cycle" which continues until No Future.

This book was Kate Orman's first sale. It was also the first New Adventure written by a woman, and the first written by an Antipodean.

Publisher's Summary
He took up a firing stance, holding the thirty-eight out in front of him. 'Mr Lennon?' he said.

1968: Cristian Alvarez meets the Doctor in London.
1978: The great temple of the Aztecs is discovered in Mexico.
1980: John Lennon is murdered in New York.
1994: A gunman runs amok in Mexico City.

Each time, Christian is there. Each time, he experiences the Blue, a traumatic psychic shock. Only the Doctor can help him - but the Doctor has problems of his own. Following the events of Blood Heat and The Dimension Riders, the Doctor knows that someone or something has been tinkering with time. Now he finds that events in his own past have been altered - and a lethal force from South America's prehistory has been released.

The Doctor, Ace and Bernice travel to the Aztec Empire in 1487, to London in the Swinging Sixties, and to the sinking of the RMS Titanic as they attempt to rectify the temporal faults - and survive the attacks of the living god Huitzilin.

Background
The Left Handed Hummingbird was Kate Orman's first published novel.

Continuity
There are several references to the serial The Aztecs.

Reference List

External links
The Left-Handed Hummingbird Prelude

1993 British novels
1993 science fiction novels
Virgin New Adventures
British science fiction novels
Novels by Kate Orman
Seventh Doctor novels